The Hong Kong Garrison was a British and Commonwealth force that protected Hong Kong. In December 1941 during the Battle of Hong Kong in the Second World War, the Japanese Army attacked Hong Kong and after a brief but violent series of engagements the garrison surrendered. The garrison continued until 1989.

1941 Garrison 
This is the garrison of Hong Kong that surrendered in December 1941.

Command
Commander Hong Kong Garrison - Maj.Gen. Christopher Maltby

Kowloon Brigade 
C.O. - Brig. Cedric Wallis
2nd Bn, Royal Scots - Lt.Col. Simon E.H.E. White
5/7th Bn, Rajput Regiment - Lt.Col. J.C. Cadogan-Rawlinson
2/14th Bn, Punjab Regiment - Lt.Col. Gerald Ralph Kidd

Hong Kong Brigade 
C.O. - Brig. John K. Lawson
1st Bn, The Middlesex Regiment (MG Battalion) - Lt.Col. Henry William Stewart
Winnipeg Grenadiers - Lt.Col. John Louis R. Sutcliff
Royal Rifles of Canada - Lt.Col. William James Horne

Fortress units 
H.Q. Fortress, Royal Engineers - Lt.Col. R.G.Lamb
Hong Kong Volunteer Defence Corps - Col. H.Rose
C.O. Royal Artillery - Col. E.H.M.Clifford
8th Coast Regiment, Royal Artillery - Lt.Col. Selby Shaw
12th Coast Regiment, Royal Artillery - Lt.Col. Richard J.L.Penfold
5th Anti-Aircraft Regiment, Royal Artillery - Lt.Col. Frederick Denton Field
1st (Hong Kong) Regt. Hong Kong and Singapore Royal Artillery - Lt.Col.John Corbet Yale

Aftermath
Following the Fall of Hong Kong to Japanese forces, most British personnel were captured, others died in the battle. For those able to escape (or later released) from Hong Kong, some managed to re-group in China. The Hong Kong Chinese Regiment and the British Army Aid Group kept the remaining elements of the Garrison alive and help it re-establish the British military after the Liberation of Hong Kong.

Structure in 1989
The British forces stationed in Hong Kong were called the "Hong Kong Garrison", which had the following structure:

British Army units
Duke of Edinburgh's Royal Regiment (Berkshire and Wiltshire) – Light role infantry unit.
6th Queen Elizabeth's Own Gurkha Rifles – Light role Gurkha infantry unit.
Royal Hong Kong Regiment (The Volunteers) – light role army reserve unit.
660 Squadron, Army Air Corps.
50th Command Workshop, Royal Electrical and Mechanical Engineers.
Hong Kong Provost Company & Hong Kong Dog Company, Royal Military Police.
415th Maritime Troop, Royal Corps of Transport.
Defence Animal Support Unit, Royal Army Veterinary Corps
48th (Gurkha) Infantry Brigade
2nd King Edward VII's Own Gurkha Rifles (The Sirmoor Rifles)
7th Duke of Edinburgh's Own Gurkha Rifles
247th Gurkha Signal Squadron, Royal Signals.
67th Gurkha Field Squadron, The Queens Gurkha Engineers.
68th Gurkha Field Squadron, The Queens Gurkha Engineers.
70th Support Squadron, The Queens Gurkha Engineers.
28th Gurkha Transport Squadron, Royal Corps of Transport.
29th Transport Squadron, Royal Corps of Transport.
31st Gurkha Transport Squadron, Royal Corps of Transport.
Royal Navy Forces / Royal Marines
Peacock-class corvette
HMS Peacock
HMS Plover
HMS Starling
HMS Swallow
HMS Swift
Hong Kong Royal Naval Volunteer Reserve
One troop of the 40 Commando, Royal Marines.
Royal Air Force Units
No. 28 Squadron RAF, Royal Air Force.

References

Bibliography
 

Military units and formations of the British Army in World War II
Military of Hong Kong under British rule
British Armed Forces deployments